Hayley may refer to:

People
Hayley (list of people with this given name)
Hayley (surname) (list of people with this surname)

Places
Hayley Green, West Midlands, a suburb of Halesowen, West Midlands, England
Hayley Green, an area of Warfield, Berkshire, England
Hayley Stadium, a speedway track in Newport, Wales

See also

Hailey (disambiguation)
Haley (disambiguation)
Hali (disambiguation)
Halley (disambiguation)